Peter Simpson may refer to:

Peter Simpson (Scottish footballer) (1904/05–1974), Scottish football striker who played for Crystal Palace in the 1920s and 1930s
Peter Simpson (footballer, born 1945), English footballer who played for Arsenal in the 1960s and 1970s
Peter Simpson (footballer, born 1940), English footballer who played for Burnley and Bury
Peter Simpson (Native rights activist) (c. 1871–1947), Tsimshian activist for Alaska Native rights
Peter Simpson (writer) (born 1942), and former member of the New Zealand Parliament
Sir Peter Jeffery Simpson, former president of the Royal College of Anaesthetists
Peter Simpson, vocalist who helped Joey Negro on the 2004 track "Fly Away"
Pete Simpson (born 1930), Wyoming politician and educator